Tamara Turlacheva (born September 7, 1993) is a Russian Acrobatic Gymnast, world champion in acrobatic gymnastics (Glasgow, 2008) in the category «Women's team» (2008 Acrobatic Gymnastics World Championships; jointly with Tatiana Baranovskaya and Irina Borzova). She also won bronze medal on the World Cup Series (May 23–24, 2008, Publier, France) in the category "Women's group" (jointly with Tatiana Baranovskaya and Irina Borzova).

References

External links

Russian acrobatic gymnasts
Female acrobatic gymnasts
1993 births
Living people
Medalists at the Acrobatic Gymnastics World Championships
Gymnasts from Moscow